Matthew Kennedy may refer to:

Matthew Kennedy (author) (born 1957), American author
Matthew Kennedy (cricketer) (born 1991), South African cricketer
Matthew Kennedy (footballer, born 1970), former Australian rules football player for Brisbane
Matthew Kennedy (footballer, born 1997), current Australian rules football player for Carlton
Matthew Kennedy (rugby league) (born 1981), Australian rugby league player (Newcastle Knights)
Matthew P. Kennedy (1908–1957), basketball referee
Matt Kennedy (born 1958), American footballer
Matt Kennedy, part of Astron-6
Matty Kennedy (born 1994), Scottish football player
Matthew Washington Kennedy (1921–2014), African-American classical pianist, professor and choral director
Matthew Kennedy (architect), Kentucky architect